Lunkaransar railway station is a railway station in Bikaner district, Rajasthan. Its code is LKS. It serves Lunkaransar town. The station consists of a single platform. Passenger, Express, and Superfast trains halt here.

Trains

The following trains halt at Lunkaransar railway station in both directions:

 Ahmedabad–Jammu Tawi Express
 Avadh Assam Express
 Kota–Shri Ganganagar Superfast Express
 Kalka–Barmer Express
 Bikaner–Delhi Sarai Rohilla Superfast Express

References

Railway stations in Bikaner district
Bikaner railway division